Melina Elisabeth Hale is an American neuroscientist and biomechanist. She is William Rainey Harper Professor in the Department of Organismal Biology and Anatomy, at the University of Chicago.

She studies zebrafish and other organisms to understand the role of mechanosensation in limb movement and how circuits in the brain and spinal cord control and coordinate movement more generally.

Education and career 
Hale received her B.S. in Zoology from Duke University in 1992 and her Ph.D. in Organismal Biology from the University of Chicago in 1998. She is a professor of Organismal Biology and Anatomy and Neurobiology and Computational Neuroscience at the University of Chicago. She was a Postdoctoral Fellow (1998-2001) at SUNY Stony Brook in the Department of Neurobiology and a Grass Fellow (2000) at the Marine Biological Laboratory in Woods Hole, MA.   

Hale has been a faculty member at the University of Chicago since 2002 and is currently the William Rainey Harper Professor in the Department of Organismal Biology and Anatomy. She has served in various administrative roles including as Dean for Faculty Affairs in the Biological Sciences Division (2013-2016) and Vice Provost (2016-). She also served as Co-Interim Director at the Marine Biological Laboratory in Woods Hole, MA from 2017-2018. 

She serves as President (2021-2023) for the Society for Integrative and Comparative Biology (SICB) and has previously served as chair in the Division of Comparative Biomechanics and in other roles. She was the keynote speaker at the Southeast regional meeting of the Society for Integrative and Comparative Biology (SICB).

Research 
Hale's research examines fundamental principles of sensorimotor integration and movement to better understand biological neuromechanical systems and to inform the design of underwater robotic devices. Her work has been funded by the U.S. National Science Foundation and the U. S. Office of Naval Research. 
 
In 2015, her team demonstrated that fish use fins to sense their environment in order to modulate swimming. Their work since has further refined understanding of mechanosensation in membranous fins, including 2020 published work report on encoding properties of skin mechanosensors.

Awards  
Hale has received the following awards:

 Wayne C. Booth Graduate Student Prize for Excellence in Teaching at the University of Chicago
 Faculty Award for Excellence in Teaching and Mentoring at the University of Chicago
National Science Foundation CAREER Award
 National Academies/Howard Hughes Medical Institute Education Fellow
Defense Science Study Group Fellow, Institute for Defense Analysis
Fellow of the American Association for the Advancement of Science

Selected works

 Hale ME, Long JH Jr, McHenry MJ, Westneat MW. (2002) Evolution of behavior and neural control of the fast-start escape response. Evolution 56(5):993-1007. 
 Bierman HS, Schriefer JE, Zottoli SJ, Hale ME. (2004) The effects of head and tail stimulation on the withdrawal startle response of the rope fish (Erpetoichthys calabaricus).J Exp Biol. 207(Pt 22):3985-97. 
 Bierman HS, Zottoli SJ, Hale ME. (2009) Evolution of the Mauthner axon cap. Brain Behav Evol. 73(3):174-87. 
 Liu YC, Hale ME. (2014) Alternative forms of axial startle behaviors in fishes. Zoology (Jena). 117(1):36-47. 
 Hale ME. (2014) Mapping circuits beyond the models: integrating connectomics and comparative neuroscience. Neuron. 83(6):1256-8. Review.

References 

Year of birth missing (living people)
Living people
21st-century American scientists
American women neuroscientists
American neuroscientists
21st-century American women scientists
University of Chicago alumni
University of Chicago faculty
American women academics
21st-century American academics
20th-century American scientists
20th-century American women scientists
Fellows of the American Association for the Advancement of Science